The Nielsen Corporation, self-referentially known as The Nielsen Company, and formerly known as ACNielsen or AC Nielsen, is a global marketing research firm, with worldwide headquarters in New York City, United States. Regional headquarters for North America are located in Chicago.

As of May 2010, it is part of Nielsen Holdings.

This company was founded in 1923 in Chicago by Arthur C. Nielsen Sr. in order to give marketers reliable and objective information on the impact of marketing and sales programs.  ACNielsen began expanding internationally in 1939, and now operates in more than 100 countries.

Activities 
One of Nielsen's best known creations is the Nielsen ratings, an audience measurement system that measures television, radio and newspaper audiences in their respective media markets. In 1950, they acquired the C. E. Hooper company and began attaching recording devices to a statistical sample of about 1200 consumer television sets in the United States. These devices used photographic film in mail-in cartridges to record the channels viewed by the consumer and thus determine audience size. Later, Nielsen developed electronic methods of data collection and transmission. In 1996, they split off this part of its operations into a separate company called Nielsen Media Research (NMR), which operated as an independent company until it was acquired by Dutch conglomerate VNU in 1999. The company was headquartered in Stamford, Connecticut before the acquisition by VNU.

Another market research tool was the Homescan program where sample members track and report all grocery and retail purchases, allowing purchasing patterns to be related to household demographics. Homescan covers several countries including Australia, Canada, the United Kingdom, and the United States. In 2004, ACNielsen chose the CipherLab CPT-8001 as its data collection terminal for the Homescan program throughout Asia.

International 
In Germany, ACNielsen gained reputation for their introduction of the Nielsen areas (or Nielsengebiete in German), each of which includes one or more German federal states sharing a similar economic structure, culture, and consumer behavior. Marketing strategies in Germany depend considerably on the Nielsengebiete, to the extent that some trademarks or marketing campaigns have only been introduced in some of the Nielsengebiete. In many newspapers and magazines disseminated nationwide, advertisements may be placed for just one or some Nielsengebiete; the circulation figures of print media are often stated according to Nielsengebiete as well.

Mergers and acquisitions 
In 2001, ACNielsen itself was acquired by VNU, as part of VNU's Marketing Information group, and thus is now under the same corporate umbrella as the company it spawned, NMR. Nielsen Media Research is based in New York City, while ACNielsen headquarters remain in Schaumburg, Illinois.

ACNielsen is also sister company to Nielsen//NetRatings, which measures Internet and digital media audiences, and Nielsen BuzzMetrics, which measures Consumer-Generated Media.

In 2005, ACNielsen initiated their MVP (Media Voice Panel) program.  Panel members carry an electronic monitor that detects the digital station and program identification codes hidden within the TV and radio broadcasts they are exposed to. At night, members place the monitor in a cradle that sends the collected data through the home's electrical wiring to a relay device that transmits it by phone, making it one of the first practical uses of electrical wiring as a home network. With an approximately one week notice to members, the MVP program ended on March 17, 2008.

In 2007, the owner VNU changed its name to "The Nielsen Company".

Arthur Charles Nielsen Jr. (born April 8, 1919) the man who acquired the company from his father, died at the age of 92 on October 3, 2011.

Spinoffs 
Nielsen spun off its data and analytics branch Global Consumer Business as NielsenIQ in January 2021.

See also 
 Nielsen Holdings

References

External links 
Examples for marketing based on Nielsen areas:
http://www.erdgas-marketing.de/marketing10/6000/6000.php 
http://www.aussenwerbung.de/quick_planner.php 
https://web.archive.org/web/20060715121636/http://www.sportbizz.nl/pages/structure/section005/002/pagemain/index.asp
Nielsen
 Nielsen 90 Year Timeline
 Nielsen Wire - Nielsen news blog
 Nielsen areas of Germany
 ACNielsen Australian two party preferred and preferred prime minister polling 1996 - 2007

Companies based in New York City
Companies based in Cook County, Illinois
Schaumburg, Illinois
Promotion and marketing communications
Marketing companies established in 1923
Market research companies of the United States
1923 establishments in Illinois
Companies based in Stamford, Connecticut